The Bisrampur is a large coal field located in the east of India in Chhattisgarh. Bisrampur represents one of the largest coal reserve in India having estimated reserves of 1.61 billion tonnes of coal.

References 

Coalfields of India
Mining in Chhattisgarh